XHSCCF-FM is a community radio station on 93.3 FM in Tlacolula de Matamoros, Oaxaca. The station is owned by the civil association Fundación Guish Bac, Abriendo los Cielos, A.C., associated with the Cielos Abiertos Convivencia Tlacolula church.

History
Fundación Guish Bac filed for a community station on November 30, 2015. The station was awarded on August 8, 2018. Estéreo Guish Bac had been operating as a pirate station since 2015; it relocated to its assigned 93.3 frequency in November 2018.

References

Radio stations in Oaxaca
Community radio stations in Mexico
Former pirate radio stations
Radio stations established in 2015
Radio stations established in 2018